This is a list of events in British radio during 1987.

Events

January
1 January – At midday, new transmitter for Radio 210 is switched on. this occurs after the Independent Broadcasting Authority expands the stations's licence area to broadcast across Berkshire and north Hampshire.
3 January – BBC Radio 4’s Today programme launches a Saturday edition. The Saturday programme begins at 7 am, 30 minutes later than the weekday editions.
17 January – Johnnie Walker returns to BBC Radio 1 to present a new Saturday afternoon programme The Stereo Sequence. The programme, which runs for 5½ hours, incorporates the previous stand-alone Saturday afternoon shows, including the weekly look at the American charts.

February
9 February – BBC Radio 3 launches a twice daily news bulletin from the BBC World Service. The bulletins last for less than a year and are scrapped at the start of 1988.

March
 3 March – Radio Trent's broadcast area expands when it starts broadcasting to Derbyshire.

April
No events.

May
18 May – The Yorkshire Radio Network launches. It is a networked service of evening and overnight programming, broadcast on three commercial radio stations in Yorkshire – Pennine Radio in Bradford, Viking Radio in Hull and Radio Hallam in Sheffield – providing programming every night between 8 pm, starting slightly earlier at weekends, and 6 am.
22 May – GWR's broadcast area expands when it launches in Bath.

June
No events.

July
 July – The European-wide re-organisation of band 2 of the VHF band comes into effect. It allows the full broadcasting spectrum to be available for broadcasting.
14 July – Beacon Radio's broadcast area is increased when it starts to broadcast to Shrewsbury and Telford.
17 July – John Timpson chairs Any Questions? for the final time.

August
No events.

September
4 September – Jonathan Dimbleby chairs Any Questions? for the first time.
September – Just over a year after the BBC's four local radio stations in Yorkshire launched an early evening series of specialist music programmes, the service is expanded. Programmes are broadcast on six nights a week (Wednesday to Monday) and the length of each programme is increased by 30 minutes. Consequently, the four stations now stay on air into the mid evening as the programmes are transmitted between 7 pm and 9 pm.

October
4 October – From this day, the new UK Singles Chart is released on BBC Radio 1's Sunday afternoon chart show. Previously, the programme had played songs from the chart which had been released the previous Tuesday.
5 October – Manx Radio completes a deal with United Christian Broadcasters (UCB) which sees UCB broadcast via Manx Radio for an hour on Sunday evenings on Manx Radio's AM transmitter.
9 October – Radio 1 launches a new weekly Friday evening dance music programme, presented by Jeff Young.
27 October – BBC Radio 4 launches a new twice-weekly soap opera called Citizens.
31 October – BBC Radio 1 begins launching its FM frequency starting in London.

November
8 November – Bruno Brookes reveals the 600th UK No. 1 single on the Radio 1 Chart Show as "China in Your Hand" by T'Pau. To mark the musical milestone, over the next three weeks Radio 1 plays all 600 singles to have reached number one since the UK Singles Chart was launched in 1952.

December
 6 December – Ocean Sound launches on a new frequency to cover Winchester and the north of its region, as reception in this area is rather poor from the 103.2 FM transmitter on Chillerton Down on the Isle of Wight. Ocean Sound North on 96.7 FM shares much of its programming with Ocean Sound West, except for a local breakfast show.

Unknown
 Jenni Murray becomes a regular BBC Woman's Hour presenter.
 Late in 1987, Downtown Radio begins broadcasting to the Enniskillen and Omagh areas of Northern Ireland and to coincide with its expanded broadcast area, the station briefly rebrands itself as 'DTRFM'.

Station debuts
The Superstation (1987–1990)

Changes of station frequency

Closing this year

Programme debuts
 20 April – Flying the Flag on BBC Radio 4 (1987–1992)
 27 October – Citizens on BBC Radio 4 (1987–1991)
 Up the Garden Path on BBC Radio 4 (1987–1993)

Continuing radio programmes

1940s
 Sunday Half Hour (1940–2018)
 Desert Island Discs (1942–Present)
 Down Your Way (1946–1992)
 Letter from America (1946–2004)
 Woman's Hour (1946–Present)
 A Book at Bedtime (1949–Present)

1950s
 The Archers (1950–Present)
 The Today Programme (1957–Present)
 Sing Something Simple (1959–2001)
 Your Hundred Best Tunes (1959–2007)

1960s
 Farming Today (1960–Present)
 In Touch (1961–Present)
 The World at One (1965–Present)
 The Official Chart (1967–Present)
 Just a Minute (1967–Present)
 The Living World (1968–Present)
 The Organist Entertains (1969–2018)

1970s
 PM (1970–Present)
 Start the Week (1970–Present)
 Week Ending (1970–1998)
 You and Yours (1970–Present)
 I'm Sorry I Haven't a Clue (1972–Present)
 Good Morning Scotland (1973–Present)
 Kaleidoscope (1973–1998)
 Newsbeat (1973–Present)
 The News Huddlines (1975–2001)
 File on 4 (1977–Present)
 Money Box (1977–Present)
 The News Quiz (1977–Present)
 Breakaway (1979–1998)
 Feedback (1979–Present)
 The Food Programme (1979–Present)
 Science in Action (1979–Present)

1980s
 In Business (1983–Present)
 Sounds of the 60s (1983–Present)
 After Henry (1985–1989)
 Loose Ends (1986–Present)

Ending this year
 17 October – Radio Active (1980–1987)
 Unknown – Delve Special (1984–1987)

Births
30 January – Phil Lester, Youtuber and radio presenter
4 June – Mollie King, pop singer-songwriter and broadcast presenter
14 July – Danny Howard, dance music DJ

Deaths
4 February – Wynford Vaughan-Thomas, Welsh news broadcaster (b. 1908)
9 September – Al Read, comic (b. 1909)
1 October – Douglas Cleverdon, radio producer (b. 1903)
Janet Quigley, radio executive (b. 1902)

See also 
 1987 in British music
 1987 in British television
 1987 in the United Kingdom
 List of British films of 1987

References

Radio
British Radio, 1987 In
Years in British radio